The 1933–34 CHL season was the third season of the Central Hockey League, a minor professional ice hockey league in the Midwestern United States. Five teams participated in the league, and the Minneapolis Millers won the championship.

Regular season

External links
Season on hockeydb.com

1933 in ice hockey
1934 in ice hockey